Angraecum pungens is a species of comet orchid that can be found in Cameroon, the Democratic Republic of the Congo, Equatorial Guinea, Gabon and Nigeria. It is found in dense lowland forests, downstream from waterfalls, and on periodically flooded marshes with Oxystigma mannii, between elevations of 50–1,800 m. It also occurs on Terminalia catappa. It is threatened by habitat loss from agriculture and logging.

References

pungens
Vulnerable plants